NGC 3185 is a  spiral galaxy located 20.4 Mpc away in the Leo constellation. NGC 3185 is a member of a four-galaxy group called HCG 44. It is also a member of the NGC 3190 Group of galaxies, which is a member of the Leo II Groups, a series of galaxies and galaxy clusters strung out from the right edge of the Virgo Supercluster.

References

External links
 

Barred spiral galaxies
3190
05554
030059
+04-24-024
10148+2156
Leo (constellation)
185001??